Marzena is a Polish feminine given name, and may refer to:

Marzena Broda, Polish poet, novelist, playwright and screenwriter
Marzena Godecki (born 1978), Polish-born Australian actress
Marzena Karpińska (born 1988), Polish weightlifter
Marzena Paduch (born 1965), Polish politician
Marzena Wróbel (born 1963), Polish politician
Marzena Wysocka (born 1969), female discus thrower from Poland

Polish feminine given names